The Stade dijonnais Côte D'Or, commonly known also as "Dijon" is a French rugby union based a Longvic, a suburb of Dijon and is participating in Nationale (the third level of French rugby union system).

Current standings

Palmarès 
 French Rugby Union Championship :
at the eights of finals in 1972

 Winner of Challenge de l'Espérance in 1971.
 Finalist of Challenge de l'Espérance in 1972

Current players (2012)
 Nicolas Coudre                       
 Rebouillat Joseph
 Manu Rebelo (capitaine)
 Julien Jeuvrey
 Ralulu Robanakadavu
 Vincent Cortes 
 Clément Rivier
 Yann Rave
 Nicolas Coudre
 Vincent Bourdeaux

Famous players
 Gérard Murillo
 Didier Retière
 Gérard Savin
 Morgan Parra

Dijon
Digione
1923 establishments in France
Sport in Dijon